Evocation is the act of evoking, calling upon, or summoning a spirit, demon, deity or other supernatural agents, in the Western mystery tradition. Conjuration also refers to a summoning, often by the use of a magical spell. The conjuration of the ghosts or spirits of the dead for the purpose of divination is called necromancy. Comparable practices exist in many religions and magical traditions and may employ the use of mind-altering substances with and without uttered word formulas.

In the Western mystery tradition

The Latin word evocatio was the "caIIing forth" or "summoning away" of a city's tutelary deity. The rituaI was conducted in a miIitary setting either as a threat during a siege or as a result of surrender, and aimed at diverting the god's favor from the opposing city to the Roman side, customariIy with a promise of a better-endowed cuIt or a more Iavish tempIe. Evocatio was thus a kind of rituaI dodge to mitigate Iooting of sacred objects or images from shrines that wouId otherwise be sacriIegious or impious.<ref>NichoIas PurceII, "On the Sacking of Corinth and Carthage", in Ethics and Rhetoric: CIassicaI Essays for DonaId RusseII on His Seventy (Oxford University Press, 1995), pp. 140–142.</ref>

The caIIing forth of spirits was a relatively common practice in Neoplatonism, theurgy and other esoteric systems of antiquity. In contemporary western esotericism, the magic of the grimoires is frequentIy seen as the cIassicaI exampIe of this idea. ManuaIs such as the Greater Key of Solomon the King, The Lesser Key of Solomon (or Lemegeton), the Sacred Magic of Abramelin the Mage and many others provided instructions that combined intense devotion to the divine with the summoning of a personaI cadre of spirituaI advisers and familiars.

The grimoires provided a variety of methods of evocation. The spirits are, in many cases, commanded in the name of God - most commonly using cabalistic and Hellenic 'barbarous names' added together to form long litanies. The magician used wands, staves, incense and fire, daggers and complex diagrams drawn on parchment or upon the ground. In Enochian magic, spirits are evoked into a crystal ball or mirror, in which a human volunteer (a 'seer') is expected to be able to see the spirit and hear its voice, passing the words on to the evoker. Sometimes such a seer might be an actual medium, speaking as the spirit, not just for it. In other cases the spirit might be 'housed' in a symbolic image, or conjured into a diagram from which it cannot escape without the magician's permission.

While many later, corrupt and commercialized grimoires include elements of 'diabolism' and one (The Grand Grimoire) even offers a method for making a pact with the devil, in general the art of evocation of spirits is said to be done entirely under the power of the divine. The magician is thought to gain authority among the spirits only by purity, worship and personal devotion and study.

In more recent usage, evocation refers to the calling out of lesser spirits (beneath the deific or archangelic level), sometimes conceived of as arising from the self. This sort of evocation is contrasted with invocation, in which spiritual powers are called into the self from a divine source.

Important contributors to the concept of evocation include Henry Cornelius Agrippa, Francis Barrett, Samuel Liddell MacGregor Mathers, Aleister Crowley, Franz Bardon and Kenneth Grant. The work of all of these authors can be seen as attempts to systematize and modernize the grimoiric procedure of evocation. Many modern authors, such as Peter Carroll and Konstantinos, have attempted to describe evocation in a way independent enough from the grimoiric tradition to fit similar methods of interaction with alleged supernatural agents in other traditions.

Conjuration

In traditional and most contemporary usage refers to a magical act of invoking spirits or using incantations or charms to cast magical spells. In the context of legerdemain, it may also refer to the performance of illusion or magic tricks for show. This article discusses mainly the original and primary usage, describing acts of a supernatural or paranormal nature.

The word conjuration (from Latin conjure, conjurare'', to "swear together") can be interpreted in several different ways: as an invocation or evocation (the latter in the sense of binding by a vow); as an exorcism; and as an act of producing effects by magical means.

The word is often used synonymously with terms such as "invocation" or "evocation" or "summoning", although many authors find it useful to maintain some distinction between these terms. The term "conjuring" is also used as a general term for casting spells in some magical traditions, such as Hoodoo. In that context, amulets and talismans are often kept in a "conjure bag" and "conjuring oils" may be used to anoint candles and other magical supplies and thus imbue them with specific magical powers.

The text of the charms to be recited to conjure the spirit varies considerably from simple sentences to complex paragraphs with plenty of magic words. The language usually is that of the conjurer's, but since the Middle Ages in Western tradition, Latin was the most common (although many texts have been translated into other languages).

In other beliefs
Evocation is the magical art of calling forth angels or demons to bring spiritual inspiration, do the bidding of the magician or provide information. Methods of this exist in many cultures that feature a belief in spirits, such as the shamanic traditions. Daoism, Shinto, Spiritism and the African religions (Santería, Umbanda, etc.) have particular systems of evocation.

Conjuration is a very common mystical practice in Mid-West Asia, most commonly found in Morocco, Oman, Saudi Arabia, the United Arab Emirates and Iraq. Many practice it to settle personal grudges or for healing, personal enhancement, or foretelling the future. There are also those who will sell their services as conjurers to others.

Islam strongly forbids the use of conjuration, because it is seen as an unholy procedure, and therefore to perform it is to give an insult to Allah. It is also considered to, in the end, harm people more than help them: those who regularly contact demons are believed to go mad through overdosing on power, or being possessed (since demons are thought to be short-tempered entities, and, given the opportunity, might overpower and enslave the one who summoned them).

A conjuration is traditionally linked to repelling negative spirits away, and protecting an individual, space or collective. However, it is also believed by some, particularly in Christianity and Islam, that magic and conjuration is an inherently evil practice. Conjurers summon demons or other evil spirits to cause harm to people or things, to obtain favors from them, or simply to enter their servitude. The belief in similarly minded conjurers also exists in belief systems in which magic is not inherently evil, although in these cultures these "black magicians" are not the rule and have opposition among more traditional magicians.

Within some magical traditions today, such as contemporary witchcraft, hoodoo and Hermeticism or ceremonial magic, conjuration may refer specifically to an act of calling or invoking deities and other spirits; or it may refer more generally to the casting of magic spells by a variety of techniques. Used in the sense of invoking or evoking deities and other spirits, conjuration can be regarded as one aspect of religious magic.

In the context of illusionist magic practiced today as entertainment only, "conjurer" or "conjuror" is still a common term used by practitioners. In times past, illusionist conjurors were suspected of using magic power to create their entertaining illusions and even suspected of casting spells. They were regarded as "magicians" by the general public, who were often not cognizant of the techniques and tricks used to create their illusions.

See also

References

Further reading

External links

Anthropology of religion
Ceremonial magic
Magic (supernatural)
Mysticism
Ritual